Skäckerfjällen Nature Reserve is a nature reserve in Jämtland County in Sweden.

Skäckerfjällen literally means "The Skäcker mountains" and the large nature reserve covers this whole range, which is part of the Scandinavian Mountains. It is a mountain landscape of a kind typical for the Scandinavian mountain range. Within the area, three old-growth forests exist which are rather different from each other. In the Strådalen area close to the border with Norway, the old-growth forest is dominated by large spruce trees, while in the area around Lake Lågsjön the forest is dominated by Scots pine, often in the form of krummholz. In Rutsdalen area, old-growth forest dominated by spruce is separated from mixed coniferous old-growth forest which grow on thin moraine.

Two traditional mountain farms exist in the area. Their continuous existence has generated a cultural landscape with high biodiversity.

The area is used by the Sami population for reindeer grazing all year around.

References

Nature reserves in Sweden
Mountains of Sweden
Geography of Jämtland County
Tourist attractions in Jämtland County
Protected areas established in 1988
1988 establishments in Sweden